Serge Blisko (born 6 January 1950) is a French politician and a member of the National Assembly of France from 1997 to 2012. He was reelected as the member of the seventh legislature (spanning from 2007 to 2012) for the tenth Parisian constituency. He is a socialist, a doctor, and a member of the municipal government for the 13th arrondissement of Paris.

He was appointed President of the French government agency MIVILUDES from August 2012 to October 2018.

He is a native speaker of Yiddish.

List of mandates held

 1983-11-05 – 1986-04-01 : MP
 1986-03-17 – 1992-03-22 : Member of the Regional council of the Île-de-France.
 1993-01-01 – 1995-06-18 : Member of the general council of Paris.
 1993-01-01 – 1995-06-18 : Member of the council of Paris.
 1995-06-19 – 2001-03-18 : Member of the general council of Paris.
 1995-06-19 – 2001-03-18 : Member of the council of Paris.
 1997-06-01 – 2002-06-18 : MP
 2001-03-19  – 2008-03-16 : Member of the council of Paris; Member of the municipal council of the thirteenth borough of Paris, of which he was the mayor until 2007-07-12 (replaced by Jérôme Coumet)
 2002-06-18 – 2007-06-17 : MP

References

1950 births
Living people
Politicians from Nancy, France
French people of Polish-Jewish descent
Jewish French politicians
Socialist Party (France) politicians
Deputies of the 7th National Assembly of the French Fifth Republic
Deputies of the 11th National Assembly of the French Fifth Republic
Deputies of the 12th National Assembly of the French Fifth Republic
Deputies of the 13th National Assembly of the French Fifth Republic
Officers of the Ordre national du Mérite
Mayors of arrondissements of Paris
20th-century French physicians